Tony Lourey (born August 15, 1967) is an American politician. He is a former Minnesota commissioner of human services and former Democratic–Farmer–Labor (DFL) member of the Minnesota Senate, representing District 11.

Early life, education, and career
Lourey was born in Pine County, Minnesota. He attended the University of Minnesota, graduating with a Bachelor of Arts, Hamline University School of Law, and William Mitchell College of Law, graduating with a Juris Doctor in 2011. Before his election to the Senate, he was a township supervisor of Kerrick Township for eight years.

Political career
Lourey was elected to the Minnesota Senate in 2006 to represent District 8, succeeding his mother, Becky Lourey. He was reelected in 2010. After redistricting, he was elected to represent District 11—which included Carlton and Pine counties and parts of Kanabec and St. Louis counties in the northeast—in 2012 and reelected in 2016. He resigned on January 3, 2019, after Governor Tim Walz selected him as commissioner of human services.

Personal life
Lourey and his wife, Marlana Benzie-Lourey, have three children. They are the owners of the Askov American newspaper, which was founded by former legislator and governor Hjalmar Petersen.

References

External links

1967 births
Living people
University of Minnesota alumni
People from Pine County, Minnesota
Democratic Party Minnesota state senators
Hamline University School of Law alumni
21st-century American politicians